A royal family is the extended family of a monarch.

Royal Family may also refer to:

 Royal Family (film), a 1969 British documentary film
 Royal Family (TV series), a 2011 South Korean television drama
 The Royal Family (album)
 The Royal Family (novel), by William T. Vollmann
 The Royal Family (play), by George S. Kaufman and Edna Ferber
 The Royal Family (TV series), American television series
 Singer Paul Young's backing group

See also
 Dynasty
 King family (disambiguation)
 Royal household
 The Royle Family, a British television series by Caroline Aherne and Craig Cash